Arabella Gabrielle Sims (born 25 May 2005) from Henderson, Nevada is an American swimmer.

At the 2020 United States Olympic Trials Sims finished fifth in the 200 freestyle, qualifying her for the relay team at the 2020 Olympics.  She was one of four high school athletes to make the United States team.  Entering the trials, she qualified for 11 of the 14 contested events.

2022

World Championships 
At the 2022 World Aquatics Championships in Budapest Sims swam in the preliminaries of the 4 × 200 metre freestyle relay recording a time of 1:55.91 which earned her a place in the final. The 17 year old then swam the anchor leg in the final with a split of 1:54.60 which was nearly three seconds quicker than her flat start personal best of 1:57.53. The Americans won the relay giving Sims her first gold medal in a major international championship.

References

External links 
 

2005 births
Living people
People from Henderson, Nevada
American female freestyle swimmers
Swimmers at the 2020 Summer Olympics
Sportspeople from the Las Vegas Valley
Medalists at the 2020 Summer Olympics
Olympic silver medalists for the United States in swimming
21st-century American women
World Aquatics Championships medalists in swimming